Malandrone is a village in Tuscany, central Italy, administratively a frazione of the comune of Castellina Marittima, province of Pisa. At the time of the 2001 census its population was 32.

Malandrone is about 50 km from Pisa and 10 km from Castellina Marittima.

References 

Frazioni of the Province of Pisa